Alagappa Alagappan (December 3, 1925 - October 24, 2014) was the founder of the Hindu Temple Society of North America.

Early life 
Alagappan was born in Kanadukathan, India. Alagappan graduated with bachelor's and master's degrees from Presidency College in Chennai. Alagappan later received a master's degree from the London School of Economics and Political Science in international relations.

Career 
In London, Alagappan worked for BBC. Remarkably, while working at BBC, Alagappan interviewed a pope. After working at BBC, Alagappan returned to India and became a journalist for The Hindu. He went on to work at the United Nations in Bangkok and transferred to New York in 1961. Alagappan worked at the UN for 30 years and served as the deputy director of the natural resources and energy division.

The Hindu Temple Society of North America 
Algappan, along with a few others, established the Hindu Temple Society of North America in 1970. He served as the chairman of the temple till 2000.

References

1925 births
2014 deaths
American  officials of the United Nations
Presidency College, Chennai alumni
Alumni of the London School of Economics
Indian emigrants to the United States